Álvaro Hernández de Miguel (born 9 August 1990), commonly known as Nandi, is a Spanish footballer who plays for Internacional de Madrid as a central defender.

Football career
Born in Soria, Castile and León, Nandi finished his graduation with CD Numancia's youth setup, and made his senior debuts with the reserves in the 2007–08 season in the Tercera División. On 14 June 2008, while still a junior, he made his first-team debut, starting in a 2–2 home draw against Polideportivo Ejido, in the Segunda División.

On 12 November Nandi appeared with the main squad in a 0–2 away loss against Sporting de Gijón, playing the last eight minutes in the season's Copa del Rey. On 19 June 2010 he scored his first professional goal, but in a 2–4 away loss against Cádiz CF.

In July 2011 Nandi signed with another reserve team, Real Murcia Imperial, also in the fourth level. A season later he joined Segunda División B side CD Tudelano.

References

External links

1990 births
Living people
People from Soria
Sportspeople from the Province of Soria
Spanish footballers
Footballers from Castile and León
Association football defenders
Segunda División players
Segunda División B players
Tercera División players
CD Numancia B players
CD Numancia players
Real Murcia Imperial players
CD Tudelano footballers
UD San Sebastián de los Reyes players
CF Talavera de la Reina players
Internacional de Madrid players